The Embarcadero and Sansome station is a light rail station in San Francisco, California, serving the San Francisco Municipal Railway's E Embarcadero and F Market & Wharves heritage railway lines. It is located on The Embarcadero at Chestnut and Sansome Streets. The station opened on March 4, 2000, with the streetcar's extension to Fisherman's Wharf.

The stop is served by the  bus route, which provides service along the F Market & Wharves and L Taraval lines during the late night hours when trains do not operate.

References

External links 

SFMTA – The Embarcadero & Sansome St northbound, southbound
SFBay Transit (unofficial): The Embarcadero & Sansome St

Sansome
Railway stations in the United States opened in 2000